Gilla in Chomded húa Cormaic was a Gaelic-Irish poet of the early Middle Ages, fl. c. 1150 - c.1170.

Biography
Gilla in Chomded was a poet, scribe and scholar at the monastery of Tulach Léis (Tullylisk, County Down).

He authored the poem A Rí richid, réidig dam, which has received extensive scholarly attention since the 19th century but still lacks a critical edition. It survives in the Book of Leinster.

Aimirgin Glúngel tuir tend is another surviving poem credited to him.

Notes and references

Further reading
 Trinity College Dublin Library, MS 1339 (H 2. 18, Book of Leinster), p. 144b.
 Ernst Windisch, L'ancienne légende irlandaise et les poésies ossianiques. Trad. E. Ernault, Revue Celtique 5 (1881) 70–93.
 Heinrich Zimmer, Anzeige von 'Essai d'un Catalogue de la littérature epique d'Irlande''', Göttingische gelehrte Anzeigen (1887) 169–175; 184–193.
 Henri d'Arbois de Jubainville, La littérature ancienne de l'Irlande et l'Ossian de Mac-Pherson, Bibl. de l'École des Chartes 41 (1888) 475–487.
 Alfred Nutt, A new theory of the Ossianic Saga, Academy 39 (1891) 161–163; 235.
 Heinrich Zimmer, Ossin und Oskar. Ein weiteres Zeugnis für den Ursprung der irisch-gälischen Finn (-Ossian-) Sage in der Vikingerzeit, Zeitschrift für deutsches Alterthum 35 (1891) 1–176.
 George Henderson, The Fionn Saga, Celtic Review 1–3 (1904–1906).
 Edmund Curtis, Age and Origin of the Fenian tales, Ivernian Society Journal 1 (1909) 159–168.
 Kuno Meyer, Fianaigecht [Introduction]. Todd Lecture Series 16 (Dublin 1910).
 F. Mezger, Finn mac Cumaill und Fingal bis zum 17. Jahrhundert, American Journal of Philology 48 (1929) 361–367.
 R. D. Scott, The Thumb of Knowledge in legends of Finn, Sigurd and Taliesin. Studies in Celtic and French literature (New York 1930).
 Roger Chauviré (tr.), Contes ossianiques (Paris 1949).
 Josef Weisweiler, Die Kultur der irischen Heldensage, Paideuma 4 (1950) 149–170.
 Gerard Murphy, Duanaire Finn. The Book of the lays of Fionn, pt 3. Dublin 1953 (=ITS volume 43.)
 Gerard Murphy, The Ossianic lore and romantic tales of medieval Ireland, (Dublin 1955; reprinted 1961; reprinted Cork, Mercier Press, 1971 with revisions.)
 Josef Weisweiler, Hintergrund und Herkunft der ossianischen Dichtung, Literaturwissenschaftliches Jahrbuch 4 (1963), p. 21–42.
 David Krause, The hidden Oisín, Studia Hibernica 6 (1966) 7–24.
 Seán Mac Giolla Riabhaigh, 'Ní bía mar do bá.' Scrúdú téamúil ar na laoithe Fiannaíochta, Irisleabhar Mhá Nuad (1970), p. 52–63.
 James MacKillop, Fionn mac Cumhaill: Celtic Myth in English Literature. Syracuse 1986.
 Dáithí Ó hÓgáin, Fionn Mac Cumhaill: Images of a Gaelic Hero, Dublin 1988.
 Máirtín Ó Briain, Review of Ó hÓgáin, Bealoideas 57 (1989), p. 174–183.
 Donald E. Meek, Review of Ó hÓgáin, Cambridge Medieval Celtic Studies 22 (Winter 1991), p. 101–103.

External links
 http://www.ucc.ie/celt/published/G303018

Irish scribes
People from County Down
12th-century Irish writers
12th-century Irish historians
Medieval European scribes
12th-century Irish poets
Irish male poets
Irish-language writers